Comin' Correct in 88 is the second studio album by American rapper and producer MC Shy D. It was released on July 13, 1988 via Luke Skyywalker Records, his final effort on the label. The album peaked at number 35 on the Top R&B Albums chart in the US.

Track listing

Personnel 
 Peter T. Jones – main artist, vocals, producer, arranging
 Aldrin Davis – scratches, producer 
 Mike Fresh McCray – scratches, lead producer 
 Michael Dennis Johnson – mixing, recording, co-producer
 Luther Campbell – executive producer
 Manny Morell – design
 Ed Robinson – photography

Charts

References

External links 
 

1988 albums
MC Shy D albums
Luke Records albums
Albums produced by DJ Toomp